Drumblade is a hamlet in north-western Aberdeenshire, Scotland, which lies 4¾ miles east of the town of Huntly.

Schools
Drumblade Primary School is a primary school with a nursery unit, and a total roll of 53 as of 2013. It is a feeder school for The Gordon Schools, Huntly. It made the national news in 2012 when its pet ducks disappeared, presumed stolen.

History
Drumblade Stone Circle, or Ston(e)yfield, is the remains of an ancient stone circle.

Drumblade is the site of the Battle of Slioch in December 1307, involving Robert the Bruce.

Notable residents
William Garden Blaikie minister, later Free Church moderator 
George Ramsay Davidson minister of Drumblade from 1828 to 1842

References

Hamlets in Scotland